Wolfgang Krull (26 August 1899 – 12 April 1971) was a German mathematician who made fundamental contributions to commutative algebra, introducing concepts that are now central to the subject.

Krull was born and went to school in Baden-Baden.  He attended the Universities of Freiburg, Rostock and finally Göttingen from 1919–1921, where he earned his doctorate under Alfred Loewy. He worked as an instructor and professor at Freiburg, then spent a decade at the University of Erlangen. In 1939 Krull moved to become chair at the University of Bonn, where he remained for the rest of his life. Wolfgang Krull was a member of the Nazi Party.

His 35 doctoral students include Wilfried Brauer, Karl-Otto Stöhr and Jürgen Neukirch.

See also 
 Cohen structure theorem
 Jacobson ring
 Local ring
 Prime ideal
 Real algebraic geometry
 Regular local ring
 Valuation ring
 Krull dimension
 Krull ring
 Krull topology
 Krull–Azumaya theorem
 Krull–Schmidt category
 Krull–Schmidt theorem
 Krull's intersection theorem
 Krull's principal ideal theorem
 Krull's separation lemma
 Krull's theorem

Publications

References

External links 

 
 

1899 births
1971 deaths
20th-century German mathematicians
Nazi Party members
Algebraists